Đorđe Kamber (born 20 November 1983) is a Bosnian footballer who plays for Hungarian club Budapest Honvéd II.

Club career
He has previously played with Serbian lower leagues clubs FK Zastava Kragujevac, FK Remont Čačak, FK Mačva Šabac and FK Srem, First League of Serbia and Montenegro club OFK Beograd, Premier League of Bosnia and Herzegovina club FK Željezničar and Hungarian National Championship I clubs Diósgyőri VTK and Győri ETO.

Budapest Honvéd
In the summer of 2015, Kamber left Győr and signed for Honvéd ahead of the 2015–16 Nemzeti Bajnokság I season.

Kamber was an influential member of the Budapest Honvéd squad that won the league title for the first time in 24 years in 2016–17, playing in all 32 league matches. On 3 June 2020, Kamber scored the winning goal for Budapest Honvéd in the final of the Magyar Kupa against Mezőkövesdi SE.

Club statistics
Updated 15 May 2021.

Updated to games played as of 15 May 2021.

Honours
Gyõr
NB I: 2012–13

Budapest Honvéd
NB I: 2016–17
Magyar Kupa: 2019–20

References

External links
 Official site profile
 
 Profile and stats until 2003 in Dekisa.Tripod

1983 births
Living people
People from Sanski Most
Serbs of Bosnia and Herzegovina
Association football midfielders
Bosnia and Herzegovina footballers
FK Remont Čačak players
OFK Beograd players
FK Mačva Šabac players
FK Srem players
FK Željezničar Sarajevo players
Diósgyőri VTK players
Zalaegerszegi TE players
Győri ETO FC players
Budapest Honvéd FC players
First League of Serbia and Montenegro players
Premier League of Bosnia and Herzegovina players
Nemzeti Bajnokság I players
Bosnia and Herzegovina expatriate footballers
Expatriate footballers in Serbia and Montenegro
Expatriate footballers in Hungary
Bosnia and Herzegovina expatriate sportspeople in Serbia and Montenegro
Bosnia and Herzegovina expatriate sportspeople in Hungary